Architect Kasëmi (1570–1659), born in Gremsh (Tomorricë), formerly Skrapar district, Albania, was an Albanian master of Ottoman classical architecture. He graduated in architecture in Istanbul and was ranked among the closest assistants of architect Mimar Sinan.

After the death of chief court architect Hasan Agha in 1622, he became the chief architect of the Ottoman Empire, and has created original monumental works such as Baghdad Kiosk, Revan Kiosk, Tiled Kiosk within Topkapı Palace in Istanbul. He rebuilt one of the most beautiful buildings of Topkapı Palace, Basketmakers' Kiosk at Sarayburnu. Architect Kasım Agha projected the second largest covered shopping mall, the Spice Bazaar in Eminönü, which was completed in 1660 by Architect Mustafa. He constructed also many works in Albania such as inns, bridges, baths and the tracks of Medieval roads in Berat, Korcë, and so on.

Involved in court disputes, he was exiled to Gallipoli in 1644. After one year he was pardoned, and returned to the palace. Kasım Ağa excelled more in politics than in architecture. So, by helping Köprülü Mehmet Paşa to ascend to the post of grand vizier, he initiated the Köprülü era in the Ottoman history. He died in 1659.

References

1570 births
1659 deaths
Albanian architects
Architects from the Ottoman Empire
Recipients of Ottoman royal pardons
People from Gramsh, Elbasan
Albanians from the Ottoman Empire